This is a list of public art in the Vale of Glamorgan. The Vale of Glamorgan is a county borough in south-east Wales. It is the southernmost unitary authority in Wales and is bordered by Bridgend, Cardiff, and Rhondda Cynon Taf. This list applies only to works of public art on permanent display in an outdoor public space and does not, for example, include artworks in museums.

Barry

Cowbridge

Dinas Powys

Llangan

Llantwit Major

Penarth

Porthkerry

St Athan

Wenvoe

References

Vale of Glamorgan
Vale of Glamorgan